Satyanarayan Singh Yadav is an Indian politician. He was elected to the Bihar Legislative Assembly from Dehri in the 2019 by election as a member of the Bharatiya Janata Party. By-elections happen due to Disqualification Of Mohammad Iliyas Hussain.

References

Living people
Bharatiya Janata Party politicians from Bihar
People from Rohtas District
Bihar MLAs 2015–2020
Year of birth missing (living people)